Darrell Lynn Bell, Jr. (born July 2, 1981), who goes by the stage name Stephen the Levite or STL abbreviation, is an American Christian hip hop musician. The Last Missionary was released by Lamp Mode Recordings in 2012. This album would be his breakthrough release on the Billboard charts. He is a member of Christian hip hop collective, The Collective, with Timothy Brindle and Zae da Blacksmith.  He is known for his complex flow patterns, and multi-syllable rhyme schemes.

Early life
Stephen the Levite was born Darrell Lynn Bell, Jr., in San Diego County, California on July 2, 1981. Stephen the Levite's father is Darrell Lynn Bell, Sr. and his mother is Cheryl Bell (nee, Goodrum).

Music career
Stephen the Levite started making music in 2001. He became signed to Lamp Mode Recordings in 2007. To Die Is Gain was his debut album and the second album was 2010's The Forerunner. However, it took until 2012's The Last Missionary for the artist to crack the Billboard charts. New Release Tuesday rated the album four stars out of five. He is a member of Christian hip hop collective, The Collective, with Timothy Brindle and Zae da Blacksmith. Can I Be Honest? was rated four out of five by Indie Vision Music.

Studio albums

References

1981 births
Living people
African-American rappers
African-American Christians
Musicians from Pennsylvania
Performers of Christian hip hop music
Rappers from California
Rappers from Philadelphia
21st-century American rappers
21st-century African-American musicians
20th-century African-American people